The 1883–84 FAW Welsh Cup was the seventh edition of the annual knockout tournament for competitive football teams in Wales.

First round

Northwich Victoria withdrew because of the distance.

Replays

Both clubs go through.

Second round

Third round

Fourth round

Semifinals

Final

Replay

References

 
 Welsh Football Data Archive

1882-83
1883–84 domestic association football cups